Darkworks S.A. was an independent video game developer and technology company based in Paris, France. The company is known for its games that include Alone in the Dark: The New Nightmare and Cold Fear.

Darkworks was founded in 1998 by Antoine Villette (President) and Guillaume Gouraud (General Manager and Artistic Director). The studio employed more than 100 people. In October 2011, the studio was placed into compulsory liquidation and was closed.

PlayAll 
In addition to its game development activities, the company lead several other companies on PlayAll, an integrated multimedia production toolchain and set of engines funded by the Cap Digital cluster.

TriOviz for Games Technology 

TriOviz company in partnership with Darkworks developed the TriOviz for Games Technology, a technological solution that enables smooth stereoscopic 3D conversion of video games or multimedia products. Following Darkworks Liquidation, TriOviz bought the companies stereoscopic activities and teams.

Games

References

External links 
 
 Darkworks entry at IGN
 TriOviz for Games
 TriOviz INFICOLOR 3D Glasses

Defunct video game companies of France
Video game companies established in 1998
Video game companies disestablished in 2011
Video game development companies